Bilko may refer to:

 Ernest G. Bilko, main protagonist of The Phil Silvers Show
 Sgt. Bilko, a 1996 film adaptation of The Phil Silvers Show, starring Steve Martin
 Steve Bilko, a baseball player
 Blake Williams, an Australian professional freestyle motocross rider